The Padma ( Pôdma) is a major river in Bangladesh. The city of Rajshahi is situated on the banks of the river. Since 1966, over 66,000 hectares of land has been lost due to erosion of the Padma.

History

Etymology
The Padma, Sanskrit for lotus flower, is a mentioned in Hindu mythology as a byname for the Goddess Lakshmi. 

The name Padma is given to the lower part of the course of the Ganges (Ganga) below the point of the off-take of the Bhagirathi River (India), another Ganges River distributary also known as the Hooghly River. Padma had, most probably, flowed through a number of channels at different times. Some authors contend that each distributary of the Ganges in its deltaic part is a remnant of an old principal channel, and that starting from the westernmost one, the Bhagirathi (in West Bengal, India), each distributary to the east marks a position of a newer channel than the one to the west of it.

Geographic effects

Eighteenth-century geographer James Rennell referred to a former course of the Ganges north of its present channel, as follows:

The places mentioned by Rennell proceeding from west to east are Rampur Boali, the headquarters of Rajshahi district, Puthia and Natore in the same district and Jaffarganj in the district of Dhaka. It is now known as Payla Jaffarganj and is close to Elachipur opposite Goalunda.

Authorities agree that the Ganges has changed its course and that at different times, each of the distributaries might have been the carrier of its main stream.

The bed of the Padma is wide, and the river is split up into several channels flowing between constantly shifting sand banks and islands. During the rains the current is very strong and even steamers may find difficulty in making headway against it. It is navigable at all seasons of the year by steamers and country boats of all sizes and until recently ranked as one of the most frequented waterways in the world. It is spanned near Paksey by the great Hardinge Bridge over which runs one of the main lines of the Bangladesh Railway.

Geography
The Padma enters Bangladesh from India near Nawabganj and meets the Jamuna ( Jamuna) near Aricha and retains its name, but finally meets with the Meghna near Chandpur and adopts the name "Meghna" before flowing into the Bay of Bengal.

Rajshahi, a major city in western Bangladesh, is situated on the north bank of the Padma.

The Ganges originates in the Gangotri Glacier of the Himalaya, and runs through India and Bangladesh to the Bay of Bengal. The Padma enters Bangladesh at Shibganj in the district of Chapai Nababganj. The Ganges branches into two distributaries, the Hooghly and the Padma at Giria in Murshidabad district of India. 

Further downstream, in Goalando,  from the source, the Padma is joined by the Jamuna (Lower Brahmaputra) and the resulting combination flows with the name Padma further east, to Chandpur. Here, the widest river in Bangladesh, the Meghna joins the Padma, continuing as the Meghna almost in a straight line to the south, ending in the Bay of Bengal.

Pabna District

Kushtia District
The Jalangi River is thrown off at the point where the mighty Padma touches the district at its most northernly corner, and flows along the northern border in a direction slightly southeast, until it leaves the district several kilometres to the east of Kushtia. It carries immense volumes of water and is very wide at places, constantly shifting its main channel, eroding vast areas on one bank, throwing chars on the other, giving rise to many disputes as to the possession of the chars and islands which are thrown up.

Murshidabad District

Murshidabad District situated on the western bank of The Padma. It flows dividing the Rajshahi and Murshidabad District of West Bengal and created a natural river border between India and Bangladesh. Jalangi area of the district was seriously affected by River bank erosion of Padma.

Rajshahi District

Rajshahi is the largest city among the cities which is situated on the bank of Padma river. It is the third largest city in Bangladesh. It is a major city in the north Bengal. Rajshahi has a decorated embankment of Padma. Rajshahi Collegiate School is one of the oldest schools in Indian Subcontinent, situated on Padma river bank. The school was endangered three times by the disintegration of the Padma river. Padma Food Garden, A.H.M. Kamaruzzaman Central Park and Zoo, Barokuthi Nandan Park, Muktamancha, and 'T' shaped embankment (Bengali: টি বাঁধ) are best tourist spot in Rajshahi which are situated on the bank of Padma river.

Infrastructure

Damming 
After the construction of the Farakka Barrage on the Ganges River in West Bengal, the maximum flows in the Padma River were reduced significantly. The flow reduction caused many problems in Bangladesh, including the loss of fish species, the drying of Padma's distributaries, increased saltwater intrusion from the Bay of Bengal, and damage to the mangrove forests of the Sundarbans.

Padma Bridge 
The Padma Bridge is the Bangladesh's largest, estimated at US$3 billion to finish. The bridge was inaugurated on 25 June 2022. It was supposed to be open to the public in 2013. However, the future of the project became uncertain when in June 2012 the World Bank cancelled its $1.2 billion loan over corruption allegations. In June 2014, the government of Bangladesh, proceeding without the loan, hired a Chinese firm to construct the  main part of the bridge; in October 2014, it hired a South Korean firm to supervise construction, with the aim of finishing the project by 2018. The final (41st) span of the bridge was installed on 10 December 2020. The last road slab was installed on the span that linked the pillars 12 and 13 of the Padma bridge on 24 August 2021.

In 2009, government plans also included rail lines on both sides of the Padma with a connection via the new bridge.

The Lalon Shah Bridge and Hardinge Bridge also crosses the Padma further upstream.

See also 
 Ganges Barrage Project
 Railway stations in Bangladesh

References

External links

 

International rivers of Asia
Border rivers
Distributaries of the Ganges
Rivers of Bangladesh
Rivers of West Bengal
Bay of Bengal
Rajshahi District
Rivers of India
Rivers of Dhaka Division
Rivers of Rajshahi Division
Rivers of Chittagong Division